Sunshine Stars Football Club is a Nigerian football club based in Akure. They play in the top division in Nigerian football, the Nigerian Premier League. Their home stadium is the Akure Township Stadium.

Funding 
Sunshine Stars FC are funded and sponsored by the Ondo State Government.

Achievements
National Division One (Second Level): 2
2001, 2007

Performance in CAF competitions
CAF Champions League: 1 appearance
2012 – Semi-finals

CAF Confederation Cup: 1 appearance
2011 – Semi-finals

West African Club Championship (UFOA Cup): 1 appearance
2009 – First Round

Notable coaches
 Kadiri Ikhana (2000)
 Rodolfo Zapata (2010)
 Paul Ashworth (2015)
 Augustine Eguavoen (2017)
 Adeyeni Joseph (2018)
 Daramola Nicholas Akinsehinwa (2013-2016)

Notable players

 Dayo Ojo
 Godfrey Oboabona

References

 
Football clubs in Nigeria
Ondo State
Sports clubs in Nigeria